Olivia Smith (born August 5, 2004) is a Canadian soccer player who plays as a midfielder for North Toronto Nitros in League1 Ontario and college soccer with the Penn State Nittany Lions.

Early life
Smith was born in North York, Ontario, but grew up in Whitby. She first played house league with the Whitby Soccer Club, before playing at the competitive level with Oshawa Kicks SC, Ajax SC, Markham FC and then North Toronto SC. Afterwards, she joined the Ontario Regional Excel (REX) program (later renamed to the NDC Ontario), before returning to North Toronto SC to train in advance of her move to college, where she committed to join the Florida State Seminoles.

College career
Initially committed to attend Florida State University, she instead decided to attend Penn State University, where she played for the women's soccer team. She made her debut on September 18, coming on as a second-half substitute against the Indiana Hoosiers. She scored her first collegiate goal on September 25 against the Illinois Fighting Illini.

Club career
In 2022, she played for the North Toronto Nitros in League1 Ontario. She made her debut on May 7 against Alliance United. In her next match on May 14, she scored her first goal against Simcoe County Rovers FC. She scored a brace on May 18 against Electric City FC. She scored four goals in a 6-1 victory over BVB IA Waterloo on June 18. After the season, she was named Young Player of the Season, Forward of the Year, and won the Golden Boot after leading the league in scoring with 18 goals, while only appearing in 11 games. She was also named a league First Team All-Star and U18 All-Star in 2022.

International career
In 2017, she made her debut in the Canada Soccer program, when she attended a youth camp at age 12. She made her international debut for the Canadian U15 team at the 2018 CONCACAF Girls' Under-15 Championship.

In late October 2019, she was called up to the Canada women's national soccer team for the first time. On November 7, 2019, she became the youngest player ever to debut for the senior national team at the 15 years and 94 days old, when she replaced Jordyn Huitema in the 86th minute of a match against Brazil in the Women's International Tournament played in Chongqing, China, breaking the previous record set by Kara Lang. In the same tournament, Smith got her second international cap in a match against New Zealand. Following the appearance, she then attended a camp with the Canada U17 team.

She was named the 2019 Canadian Youth International Player of the Year. In 2022, she was named to the Canada U20 team for the 2022 FIFA U-20 Women's World Cup.

Personal life
Smith is of Jamaican, Chilean and Peruvian descent.

References

External links

Living people
2004 births
Canadian women's soccer players
Soccer players from Toronto
Sportspeople from North York
Women's association football midfielders
Canada women's international soccer players
Black Canadian women's soccer players
Canadian sportspeople of Jamaican descent
Canadian people of Chilean descent
Sportspeople of Chilean descent
Canadian people of Peruvian descent
Sportspeople of Peruvian descent
North Toronto Nitros players
League1 Ontario (women) players